Grey Silo Golf Course is an 18-hole public golf course located in Waterloo, Ontario, Canada. Opened in 2000 and owned by the city of Waterloo, the course is within RIM Park along the Grand River. Designed by Steve Young, it was the host course of the Manulife Financial LPGA Classic, a 72-hole event on the LPGA Tour, from 2012 to 2014.

Scorecard

References

External links

City of Waterloo - Grey Silo Golf Course
Manulife Financial LPGA Classic
The Weather Network - Grey Silo Golf Course

Golf clubs and courses in Ontario
Sports venues in Waterloo, Ontario
2000 establishments in Ontario